White Oak Springs may refer to:
White Oak Springs, Illinois
White Oak Springs, West Virginia
White Oak Springs, Wisconsin